The Georgetown and Western Railroad was a Southeastern railroad that served South Carolina in the late 19th century and early 20th century.

The Georgetown and Western was chartered by the South Carolina General Assembly in 1887, after the Georgetown and Lane's Railroad was sold under foreclosure in 1886. The latter began operating in 1883 and went into receivership in 1885.

The Georgetown and Western was sold in 1900 to a syndicate that controlled the Georgetown-based Atlantic Lumber Company.

The Georgetown and Western was in receivership from 1902 to 1912. The Seaboard Air Line Railway took an interest in the carrier and gave it financial assistance.

In May 1915, the Georgetown and Western Railroad was absorbed by the Carolina, Atlantic and Western Railroad, which became part of Seaboard Air Line Railway later that year.

References

Defunct South Carolina railroads
Railway companies established in 1887
Railway companies disestablished in 1915